In mathematics, the Gaussian or ordinary hypergeometric function 2F1(a,b;c;z) is a special function represented by the hypergeometric series, that includes many other special functions as specific or limiting cases. It is a solution of a second-order linear ordinary differential equation (ODE). Every second-order linear ODE with three regular singular points can be transformed into this equation.

There is no known system for organizing all of the identities; indeed, there is no known algorithm that can generate all identities; a number of different algorithms are known that generate different series of identities. The theory of the algorithmic discovery of identities remains an active research topic.

History
The term "hypergeometric series" was first used by John Wallis in his 1655 book Arithmetica Infinitorum.

Riemann showed that the second-order differential equation for 2F1(z), examined in the complex plane, could be characterised (on the Riemann sphere) by its three regular singularities.

The cases where the solutions are algebraic functions were found by Hermann Schwarz (Schwarz's list).

The hypergeometric series

It is undefined (or infinite) if  equals a non-positive integer. Here  is the (rising) Pochhammer symbol, which is defined by:

For complex arguments  with  it can be analytically continued along any path in the complex plane that avoids the branch points 1 and infinity.

As , where  is a non-negative integer, one has .  Dividing by the value  of the gamma function, we have the limit:

 is the most common type of generalized hypergeometric series , and is often designated simply .

Differentiation formulas 
Using the identity , it is shown that

 

and more generally,

 

In the special case that , we have

Special cases
Many of the common mathematical functions can be expressed in terms of the hypergeometric function, or as limiting cases of it. Some typical examples are

When a=1 and b=c, the series reduces into a plain geometric series, i.e.

hence, the name hypergeometric. This function can be considered as a generalization of the geometric series.

The confluent hypergeometric function (or Kummer's function) can be given as a limit of the hypergeometric function

so all functions that are essentially special cases of it, such as Bessel functions, can be expressed as limits of hypergeometric functions. These include most of the commonly used functions of mathematical physics.

Legendre functions are solutions of a second order differential equation with 3 regular singular points so can be expressed in terms of the hypergeometric function in many ways, for example

Several orthogonal polynomials, including Jacobi polynomials P and their special cases Legendre polynomials, Chebyshev polynomials, Gegenbauer polynomials can be written in terms of hypergeometric functions using

Other polynomials that are special cases include Krawtchouk polynomials, Meixner polynomials, Meixner–Pollaczek polynomials.

Given , let

Then

is the modular lambda function, where

.

Incomplete beta functions Bx(p,q) are related by

The complete elliptic integrals K and E are given by

The hypergeometric differential equation 
The hypergeometric function is a solution of Euler's hypergeometric differential equation

which has three regular singular points: 0,1 and ∞. The generalization of this equation to three arbitrary regular singular points is given by Riemann's differential equation. Any second order linear differential equation with three regular singular points can be converted to the hypergeometric differential equation by a change of variables.

Solutions at the singular points
Solutions to the hypergeometric differential equation are built out of the hypergeometric series 2F1(a,b;c;z). The equation has two linearly independent solutions. At each of the three singular points 0, 1, ∞, there are usually two special solutions of the form xs times a holomorphic function of x, where s is one of the two roots of the indicial equation and x is a local variable vanishing at a regular singular point. This gives 3 × 2 = 6 special solutions, as follows.

Around the point z = 0, two independent solutions are, if c is not a non-positive integer,

and, on condition that c is not an integer,

If c is a non-positive integer 1−m, then the first of these solutions does not exist and must be replaced by  The second solution does not exist when c is an integer greater than 1, and is equal to the first solution, or its replacement, when c is any other integer. So when c is an integer, a more complicated expression must be used for a second solution, equal to the first solution multiplied by ln(z), plus another series in powers of z, involving the digamma function. See  for details.

Around z = 1, if c − a − b is not an integer, one has two independent solutions

and

Around z = ∞, if a − b is not an integer, one has two independent solutions

and

Again, when the conditions of non-integrality are not met, there exist other solutions that are more complicated.

Any 3 of the above 6 solutions satisfy a linear relation as the space of solutions is 2-dimensional, giving = 20 linear relations between them called connection formulas.

Kummer's 24 solutions
A second order Fuchsian equation with n singular points has a group of symmetries acting (projectively) on its solutions, isomorphic to the Coxeter group W(Dn) of order 2n−1n!. The hypergeometric equation is the case n = 3, with group of order 24 isomorphic to the symmetric group on 4 points, as first described by
Kummer. The appearance of the symmetric group is accidental and has no analogue for more than 3 singular points, and it is sometimes better to think of the group as an extension of the symmetric group on 3 points (acting as permutations of the 3 singular points) by a Klein 4-group (whose elements change the signs of the differences of the exponents at an even number of singular points). Kummer's group of 24 transformations is generated by the three transformations taking a solution F(a,b;c;z) to one of

which correspond to the transpositions (12), (23), and (34) under an isomorphism with the symmetric group on 4 points 1, 2, 3, 4. (The first and third of these are actually equal to F(a,b;c;z) whereas the second is an independent solution to the differential equation.)

Applying Kummer's 24 = 6×4 transformations to the hypergeometric function gives the 6 = 2×3 solutions above corresponding to each of the 2 possible exponents at each of the 3 singular points, each of which appears 4 times because of the identities

Q-form
The hypergeometric differential equation may be brought into the Q-form

by making the substitution u = wv and eliminating the first-derivative term. One finds that

and v is given by the solution to

which is

The Q-form is significant in its relation to the Schwarzian derivative .

Schwarz triangle maps

The Schwarz triangle maps or Schwarz s-functions are ratios of pairs of solutions.

where k is one of the points 0, 1, ∞. The notation

is also sometimes used. Note that the connection coefficients become Möbius transformations on the triangle maps.

Note that each triangle map is regular at z ∈ {0, 1, ∞} respectively, with

and

In the special case of λ, μ and ν real, with 0 ≤ λ,μ,ν < 1 then the s-maps are conformal maps of the upper half-plane H to triangles on the Riemann sphere, bounded by circular arcs. This mapping is a generalization of the Schwarz–Christoffel mapping to triangles with circular arcs. The singular points 0,1 and ∞ are sent to the triangle vertices.  The angles of the triangle are πλ, πμ and πν respectively.

Furthermore, in the case of λ=1/p, μ=1/q and  ν=1/r for integers p, q, r, then the triangle tiles the sphere, the complex plane or the upper half plane according to whether λ + μ + ν – 1 is positive, zero or negative; and the s-maps are inverse functions of automorphic functions for the triangle group 〈p, q, r〉 = Δ(p, q, r).

Monodromy group
The monodromy of a hypergeometric equation describes how fundamental solutions change when analytically continued around paths in the z plane that return to the same point.
That is, when the path winds around a singularity of  2F1, the value of the solutions at the endpoint will differ from the starting point.

Two fundamental solutions of the hypergeometric equation are related to each other by a linear transformation; thus the monodromy is a mapping (group homomorphism):

where π1 is the fundamental group. In other words, the monodromy is a two dimensional linear representation of the fundamental group. The monodromy group of the equation is the image of this map, i.e. the group generated by the monodromy matrices. The monodromy representation of the fundamental group can be computed explicitly in terms of the exponents at the singular points.

 and 

where

If 1−a, c−a−b, a−b are non-integer rational numbers with denominators k,l,m then the monodromy group is finite if and only if , see Schwarz's list or Kovacic's algorithm.

Integral formulas

Euler type
If B is the beta function then

provided that z is not a real number such that it is greater than or equal to 1. This can be proved by expanding (1 − zx)−a using the binomial theorem and then integrating term by term for z with absolute value smaller than 1, and by analytic continuation elsewhere. When z is a real number greater than or equal to 1, analytic continuation must be used, because (1 − zx) is zero at some point in the support of the integral, so the value of the integral may be ill-defined. This was given by Euler in 1748 and implies Euler's and Pfaff's hypergeometric transformations.

Other representations, corresponding to other branches, are given by taking the same integrand, but taking the path of integration to be a closed Pochhammer cycle enclosing the singularities in various orders. Such paths correspond to the monodromy action.

Barnes integral
Barnes used the theory of residues  to evaluate the Barnes integral

as

where the contour is drawn to separate the poles 0, 1, 2... from the poles −a, −a − 1, ..., −b, −b − 1, ... . This is valid as long as z is not a nonnegative real number.

John transform
The Gauss hypergeometric function can be written as a John transform .

Gauss' contiguous relations
The six functions

This gives

relations, given by identifying any two lines on the right hand side of

where , and so on.

where m, n, and l are integers.

Gauss' continued fraction

Gauss used the contiguous relations to give several ways to write a quotient of two hypergeometric functions as a continued fraction, for example:

Transformation formulas
Transformation formulas relate two hypergeometric functions at different values of the argument z.

Fractional linear transformations
Euler's transformation is

It follows by combining the two Pfaff transformations

which in turn follow from Euler's integral representation.
It can also be written as linear combination

Quadratic  transformations
If two of the numbers 1 − c, c − 1, a − b, b − a, a + b − c, c − a − b are equal or one of them is 1/2 then there is a quadratic transformation of the hypergeometric function, connecting it to a different value of z related by a quadratic equation. A typical example is

Higher order transformations
If  1−c, a−b,  a+b−c differ by signs or two of them are 1/3 or −1/3 then there is a cubic transformation of the hypergeometric function, connecting it to a different value of z related by a cubic equation. A typical example is

There are also some transformations of degree 4 and 6. Transformations of other degrees only exist if a, b, and c are certain rational numbers .  For example,

Values at special points z

Special values at z = 1
Gauss's summation theorem, named for Carl Friedrich Gauss, is the identity

which follows from Euler's integral formula by putting z = 1. It includes the Vandermonde identity as a special case.

For the special case where , 

Dougall's formula generalizes this to the bilateral hypergeometric series at z = 1.

Kummer's theorem (z = −1) 
There are many cases where hypergeometric functions can be evaluated at z = −1 by using a quadratic transformation to change z = −1 to z = 1 and then using Gauss's theorem to evaluate the result. A typical example is Kummer's theorem, named for Ernst Kummer:

which follows from Kummer's quadratic transformations

and Gauss's theorem by putting z = −1 in the first identity. For generalization of Kummer's summation, see .

Values at z = 1/2
Gauss's second summation theorem is

Bailey's theorem is

For generalizations of Gauss's second summation theorem and Bailey's summation theorem, see .

Other points
Some typical examples are given by

which can be restated as

whenever −π < x < π and T is the (generalized) Chebyshev polynomial.

See also
Appell series, a 2-variable generalization of hypergeometric series
Basic hypergeometric series where the ratio of terms is a periodic function of the index
Bilateral hypergeometric series pHp are similar to generalized hypergeometric series, but summed over all integers
Binomial series 1F0
Confluent hypergeometric series 1F1(a;c;z)
Elliptic hypergeometric series where the ratio of terms is an elliptic function of the index
Euler hypergeometric integral, an integral representation of 2F1
Fox H-function, an extension of the Meijer G-function
Fox–Wright function, a generalization of the generalized hypergeometric function
Frobenius solution to the hypergeometric equation
General hypergeometric function introduced by I. M. Gelfand. 
Generalized hypergeometric series pFq where the ratio of terms is a rational function of the index
Geometric series, where the ratio of  terms is a constant
Heun function, solutions of second order ODE's with four regular singular points
Horn function, 34 distinct convergent hypergeometric series in two variables
Humbert series 7 hypergeometric functions of 2 variables
Hypergeometric distribution, a discrete probability distribution
Hypergeometric function of a matrix argument, the multivariate generalization of the hypergeometric series
Kampé de Fériet function, hypergeometric series of two variables
Lauricella hypergeometric series, hypergeometric series of three variables
MacRobert E-function, an extension of the generalized hypergeometric series pFq to the case p>q+1.
Meijer G-function, an extension of the generalized hypergeometric series pFq to the case p>q+1.
Modular hypergeometric series, a terminating form of the elliptic hypergeometric series
Theta hypergeometric series, a special sort of elliptic hypergeometric series.
Virasoro conformal blocks, special functions in two-dimensional conformal field theory that reduce to hypergeometric functions in some cases.

References

 
 
 Beukers, Frits (2002), Gauss' hypergeometric function. (lecture notes reviewing basics, as well as triangle maps and monodromy)
 
 
 Gasper, George & Rahman, Mizan (2004). Basic Hypergeometric Series, 2nd Edition, Encyclopedia of Mathematics and Its Applications, 96, Cambridge University Press, Cambridge. .
  
 
 
 
  (part 1 treats hypergeometric functions on Lie groups)
 

 
 
 

 

  (a reprint of this paper can be found in )
 
  (there is a 2008 paperback with )

External links
 
 John Pearson, Computation of Hypergeometric Functions (University of Oxford, MSc Thesis)
 Marko Petkovsek, Herbert Wilf and Doron Zeilberger, The book "A = B" (freely downloadable)
 

Factorial and binomial topics

Ordinary differential equations
Mathematical series